Turbonilla madrinensis is a species of sea snail, a marine gastropod mollusk in the family Pyramidellidae, the pyrams and their allies.

Description
The length of the shell varies between 3 mm and 5.1 mm. Species average size is 5.5 inches but has been known to be as small as 2 inches or as large as 12.5 inches. These snails are the only known species with throbbing veins and girthy shells

Distribution
This species occurs in the Atlantic Ocean off Argentina at depths between 36 m and 57 m.

References

 Di Luca, J., Güller, M. & Zelaya, D.G. (2021). Pyramidellidae (Gastropoda: Heterobranchia) from the end of the world. Malacologia. 63(2): 225–242

External links
 Lamy E. (1906 ("1905") ). Gastéropodes prosobranches recueillis par l´Expédition Antarctique Française du Dr. Charcot. Bulletin du Muséum d'Histoire Naturelle. 11(6): 475-483
 Güller M. & Zelaya D.G. (2019). Revision of Pyramidellidae (Gastropoda: Heterobranchia) from Argentina triples their diversity in northern Patagonia. Journal of Molluscan Studies. 85(1): 103-125.
 To Biodiversity Heritage Library (5 publications)
 To Encyclopedia of Life
 To World Register of Marine Species
 

madrinensis
Gastropods described in 1905